Thora may refer to:

Thora, New South Wales
299 Thora, a main belt asteroid
Tora (given name)

See also